Leendert Arie Nederlof (born 10 June 1966 in Oostvoorne) is a retired Dutch cyclist. He was the oldest active professional cyclist until his retirement in 2018.

Major results
1993
 1st Flèche du Sud
2001
 3rd Dorpenomloop Rucphen
2006
 2nd Overall Tour of Hong Kong Shanghai
2007
 7th Tour of Siam
2013
 1st Melaka Governor's Cup
 10th Overall Jelajah Malaysia

References

1966 births
Living people
Dutch male cyclists
People from Westvoorne
Cyclists from South Holland